The United States Food and Agriculture Act of 1977 (P.L. 95-113, also known as the 1977 U.S. Farm Bill) was an omnibus farm bill. The S. 275 legislation was passed by the 95th U.S. Congressional session and signed into law by the 39th President of the United States Jimmy Carter on September 29, 1977.

It increased price and income supports and established a farmer-owned reserve for grain. It also established a new two-tiered pricing program for peanuts. Under the peanut program, producers were given an acreage allotment on which a poundage quota was set. Growers could produce in excess of their quota, within their acreage allotment, but would receive the higher of the two price-support levels only for the quota amount. Peanuts in excess of the quota are referred to as "additionals", or additional peanuts.

Title XIII was designated the Food Stamp Act of 1977 and permanently amended the Food Stamp Act of 1964 by eliminating the purchase requirement and simplifying eligibility requirements.

Title XIV was designated the National Agricultural Research, Extension, and Teaching Policy Act and made USDA the leading federal agency for agricultural research, extension, and teaching programs.  It also consolidated the funding for these programs.

References

External links

United States Department of Agriculture
United States federal agriculture legislation
1977 in the United States
1977 in law